The Times and Northern Advertiser (subtitled: Peterborough, South Australia) was a weekly newspaper published in Peterborough, South Australia from August 1887 to 1970.

History
Petersburg was a very small town in 1887 when the railway to Broken Hill was being built, and a decision had to be made whether the ore from the mines should be shipped from Port Augusta, Port Pirie or Port Adelaide. If it were to be Port Pirie, the line would pass through Petersburg. Anxious to improve the status of the town (particularly as against rival Terowie), mayor W. Thredgold approached Robert M. Osborne with a view to establishing a newspaper (Terowie had its Enterprise, founded by James O'Loghlin). The old Anglican church building would have been an ideal premises, but it could not be got ready soon enough, so an old iron shed near the mill crossing was made available. Osborne found a likely assistant in H. P. Colebatch (later Premier of Western Australia, Agent-general and, as Sir Hal, Senator for Western Australia). The first issue of The Petersburg Times (subtitled: Orroroo Chronicle and Northern Advertiser), was a single sheet (four pages), which appeared on 12 August 1887. Barton Pullen was appointed the paper's agent and correspondent in Orroroo. A new building was erected by Osborne in 1891 on the corner of Bismarck and Jervois streets.

Managing editor of the Times from 1896 was James J. "Jim" Bennett (c. 1873 – 7 March 1900), who was succeeded by Kinso C. H. Ewins, of Burra. In 1909 R. M. Osborne sold The Times and the Quorn Mercury to W. H. Bennett, brother of the late editor and had been successfully managing the Quorn Mercury for the previous nine years. The building, which was still owned by Osborne, was destroyed by fire 23 December 1909, at a great loss to Mr. Bennett, who persisted, and built the paper into a thriving business.

Throughout its run, The Petersburg Times retained it name, although the subtitle evolved from Orroroo Chronicle and Northern Advertiser, to Terowie, Yongala, and Northern Advertiser, and finally Northern Advertiser. The change of name in May 1919 to The Times and Northern Advertiser, Peterborough, South Australia was made in response to the government's wish to remove Germanic placenames, but was not done gladly.

He founded the Booleroo Magnet and purchased the Orroroo Enterprise from Colonel Tom Hancock in 1928 and took over the Weekly Times of Adelaide. He installed up to date printing machinery, and had an excellent rapport with the business and sporting people of the area. When he died, the papers remained in the family, with W. H. Bennett's sons Harry and Jack in charge of the Orroroo and Peterborough businesses respectively.

In 1946, the newspaper absorbed the Jamestown Star and Farmer's Journal (23 July 1903 – 28 June 1946). In 1970 three other northern papers were taken over, with the Northern Review, and merged to become the Review-Times, which shortly became defunct.

Digitisation
The National Library of Australia has made digitised copies of all issues of the Petersburg Times (1887–1919), and The Times and Northern Advertiser (1919–1950), and which may be accessed on-line through its Trove service.

References

External links
 
 

Defunct newspapers published in South Australia
1887 establishments in Australia
1970 disestablishments in Australia